The Paharia Express is an express train connecting Indian cities Siliguri and Digha.
This is the first direct train service originating from New Jalpaiguri (Siliguri) to Digha Flag Station. 
This train connects North and South of West Bengal touching Bihar and West Bengal state capital Kolkata. This train runs on the Kolkata–Siliguri route.

The meaning of word "Paharia" is The people of the hills.

This train was inaugurated by the then Railway Minister India and now Chief Minister of West Bengal, Mamata Banerjee on 5 October 2009.

Accommodations
This train comprises 1 Composite [1A+3A], 1 AC 3-Tiers, 8 Sleeper class, 4 Unreserved General Compartment & 2 Luggage/Parcel cum Brake van which is provided with the Guard's cabin.
Total coach composition is 16.

Traction

Reverse

The train reverses at Howrah Junction

Time Table 
 15721 Digha Flag Station–New Jalpaiguri Paharia Express (Saturday)

 15722 New Jalpaiguri–Digha Flag Station Paharia Express (Friday)

Other trains on the Kolkata–New Jalpaiguri sector
 22301/02 Howrah–New Jalpaiguri Vande Bharat Express
 12041/42 New Jalpaiguri–Howrah Shatabdi Express
 22309/40 Howrah–New Jalpaiguri AC Express
 12377/78 Padatik Express
 13149/50 Kanchan Kanya Express
 15959/60 Kamrup Express
 13175/76 Kanchanjungha Express
 12345/46 Saraighat Express
 12343/44 Darjeeling Mail
 12518/19 Kolkata–Guwahati Garib Rath Express
 12526/27 Dibrugarh–Kolkata Superfast Express
 13141/42 Teesta Torsha Express
 13147/58 Uttar Banga Express
 12503/04 Bangalore Cantonment–Agartala Humsafar Express
 13181/82 Kolkata–Silghat Town Kaziranga Express
 22511/12 Lokmanya Tilak Terminus–Kamakhya Karmabhoomi Express
 12526/27 Dibrugarh–Kolkata Superfast Express
 15644/45 Puri–Kamakhya Weekly Express (via Howrah)
 12364/65 Kolkata–Haldibari Intercity Express
 12509/10 Guwahati–Bengaluru Cantt. Superfast Express
 12507/08 Thiruvananthapuram–Silchar Superfast Express
 12514/15 Guwahati–Secunderabad Express

See also

 Howrah–New Jalpaiguri line
 Tourism in West Bengal
 New Jalpaiguri Junction railway station
 New Jalpaiguri–Sitamarhi Weekly Express
 New Jalpaiguri-Udaipur Superfast Express
 Garib Nawaz Express
 Digha railway station

References

External links
 Indian Railway Website
 Paharia Express Forum at Indian Rail Info
 Railway Fan Club IRFCA

Transport in Jalpaiguri
Transport in Digha
Railway services introduced in 2009
Named passenger trains of India
Rail transport in West Bengal
Express trains in India
Transport in Siliguri